Robert Earle Essensa (born January 14, 1965) is a Canadian  ice hockey coach and former goaltender who played 12 seasons in the National Hockey League (NHL). Since 2003, he has served as the goaltending coach for the Boston Bruins.

Playing career
As a youth, Essensa played in the 1978 Quebec International Pee-Wee Hockey Tournament with the Toronto Shopsy's minor ice hockey team.

Junior 'B' career
Essensa was the number one goaltender for the 1982-83 Henry Carr Crusaders Metro Junior 'B' Championship team which never lost a game in regular season play (34 wins, 0 losses, 2 ties) and only two playoff games - one in the Ontario Hockey Association's Semi-finals against the Streetsville Derbys.  The Crusaders went on to capture the Ontario Hockey Association's Junior 'B' Championship and along with it, the Sutherland Cup, after defeating the Stratford Cullitons in the final.  (Following five rounds of playoffs, what it took to win the Sutherland Cup, the Crusaders had accumulated 54 wins, 2 losses, 2 ties, and 2 losses in overtime in 60 regulation games.)

He was also MVP of the league's mid-season all-star game held in Trenton, Ontario, Canada as the best of the Fullan Division defeated the stars of the Ruddock Division, 3-1.

College career
Essensa was selected in the fourth round of the 1983 NHL Entry Draft, 69th overall, by the Winnipeg Jets after dominating Junior B hockey in the Toronto area.

Following the 1983 Draft, Essensa played for Michigan State University and posted an overall record of 62–13–2 in his four years at Michigan State. He named the CCHA First Team All-Star his sophomore year and won the CCHA and NCAA Championships with Michigan State in his Junior year. He graduated as the school's all-time leader in GAA and shutouts, although both records have since been broken.

Professional career
After spending his first professional season entirely in the AHL, Essensa made his NHL debut during the 1988–89 season, and posted a 6–8–3 record in 20 games. His workload increased to 36 games in 1989–90, and he took over as Winnipeg's starting goaltender the following season. For four seasons, he was a workhorse for the Jets, averaging nearly 60 games per year.

Essensa and the Jets suffered through a dismal 1993–94 campaign, struggling to the second-worst record in the league next to the expansion Ottawa Senators. However, he was dealt to the Detroit Red Wings at the trade deadline. A legitimate contender for the Stanley Cup, Detroit had been let down in previous seasons by poor goaltending and Essensa, just two years removed from his Vezina nomination and a college star in the area at Michigan State, was considered an ideal solution. However, it proved to be a disaster as he posted a 4–7–1 record down the stretch and struggled in the playoffs, ultimately being usurped by rookie Chris Osgood.

Things went from bad to worse for Essensa in 1994–95, as Detroit acquired star veteran Mike Vernon to partner Osgood. Exiled to the minors, he spent the next two seasons in the International Hockey League.

Essensa was dealt to the Edmonton Oilers for the 1996–97 season. He spent the next two seasons backing up Curtis Joseph for the Oilers, and although his workload was limited behind one of the top goaltenders in the league, he re-established himself as a solid NHL goaltender and an above-average backup. When Joseph left Edmonton as a free agent in 1998, Essensa's responsibilities increased, as he split the goaltending duties evenly in 1998–99 with the newly acquired Mikhail Shtalenkov. While neither goaltender performed poorly, it represented a significant drop-off from Joseph and the team eventually acquired Tommy Salo late in the season to take over as the starter.

For 1999–2000, Essensa signed with the Phoenix Coyotes. The move represented a homecoming of sorts, as the Winnipeg Jets had moved to Phoenix in 1996, and gave him an opportunity to extend his franchise records for games played and wins by a goalie. Shtalenkov was dealt mid-season in a deal for Sean Burke, and Essensa finished the season as Burke's backup, posting a solid 13–10–3 record in 30 games.

Essensa was on the move again for the 2000–01 campaign, this time signing with the Vancouver Canucks to back up Félix Potvin. Ultimately, Potvin was shipped out of Vancouver and replaced by Dan Cloutier, and Essensa and Cloutier split the goaltending duties as the Canucks were knocked out of the playoffs by the Colorado Avalanche. Essensa finished the year with an 18–12–3 mark in 39 appearances, his highest win total since 1994.

After Vancouver failed to give him a serious contract offer, Essensa signed with the Buffalo Sabres for the 2001–02 season. However, he was unable to recapture his heroics of the previous year, posting an 0–5 record in 9 appearances for the Sabres before retiring at the conclusion of the season.

Essensa finished his career with a 173–176–47 record in 446 career NHL appearances, along with 17 shutouts and a 3.15 GAA.

Coaching career
Essensa has served as the goaltending coach for the Boston Bruins since 2003, and got his name on the Stanley Cup with the Bruins Stanley Cup Championship in 2011.  He also assists with coaching the goaltenders of the Providence Bruins, Boston's minor league affiliate in the American Hockey League.

On March 28, 2015, Essensa, at age 50, was dressed as a backup goalie for the Bruins during their game against the New York Rangers after Tuukka Rask left the game in the second period due to suspected dehydration.

Personal
Essensa and his wife Jeanine have three sons, Josh, Ben and Jake. They make their home in Oxford, Michigan, a northern suburb of Detroit.  After the Bruins championship in 2011, Essensa brought the Stanley Cup to local establishments in Oxford, Lake Orion, and Clarkston.

All three sons are active in Detroit-area youth hockey.

Career statistics

Regular season and playoffs

International

Awards and honours

References

External links

1965 births
Adirondack Red Wings players
Boston Bruins coaches
Buffalo Sabres players
Canadian ice hockey goaltenders
Detroit Red Wings players
Edmonton Oilers players
Moncton Hawks players
San Diego Gulls (IHL) players
Ice hockey people from Toronto
Living people
Michigan State Spartans men's ice hockey players
Phoenix Coyotes players
Vancouver Canucks players
Winnipeg Jets (1979–1996) draft picks
Winnipeg Jets (1979–1996) players
People from Oxford, Michigan
Canadian ice hockey coaches
NCAA men's ice hockey national champions